Tetyana Romanenko is a Ukrainian football striker, currently playing for Saint-Étienne in the Division 2 Féminine. She has also played for Zhytlobud-1 Kharkiv and Energiya Voronezh.

She is a member of the Ukrainian national team, and took part in the 2009 European Championship.

Honours
 French Championship D2 : Winner 2019

References

External links
 
 Tanya Romanenko at footofeminin.fr 
 
 UEFA player profile
 Tanya Romanenko prolonge jusqu'en 2022 !

1990 births
Living people
Footballers from Odesa
Ukrainian women's footballers
WFC Chornomorochka Odesa players
WFC Yuzhanka Kherson players
WFC Zhytlobud-1 Kharkiv players
Expatriate women's footballers in Russia
FC Energy Voronezh players
Kubanochka Krasnodar players
Suwon FC Women players
Stade de Reims Féminines players
Ukraine women's international footballers
Women's association football forwards
Ukrainian expatriate sportspeople in Russia
Ukrainian expatriate sportspeople in South Korea
Ukrainian expatriate sportspeople in Italy
Expatriate women's footballers in France
Ukrainian expatriate sportspeople in France
Division 1 Féminine players
S.S.D. Empoli Ladies FBC players